Rudolf Walter Ladenburg (June 6, 1882 in Kiel – April 6, 1952 in Princeton, New Jersey) was a German atomic physicist. He emigrated from Germany as early as 1932 and became a Brackett Research Professor at Princeton University. When the wave of German emigration began in 1933, he was the principal coordinator for job placement of exiled physicists in the United States.  Albert Einstein gave the eulogy at Rudolf's funeral.  He and his wife Elsa had three children, Margarethe, Kurt, and Eva.  Kurt had two children, Toni and Nils Ladenburg.

Background

Ladenburg was the son of the Jewish chemist Albert Ladenburg, ordinarius professor of chemistry at the University of Kiel (1874–1899) and then at the former University of Breslau (1899–1909). He was a non-practicing Jew and an atheist.

Education

From 1900 to 1906, Ladenburg studied at the Ruprecht-Karls-Universität Heidelberg, the Universität Breslau, and the Ludwig-Maximilians-Universität München. He received his doctorate under Wilhelm Röntgen at Munich.

Career

After completion of his Habilitation, Ladenburg became a Privatdozent at Breslau and in 1921 an ausserordentlicher Professor there. In 1924, he took an appointment at the Friedrich-Wilhelms-Universität (today, the Humboldt-Universität zu Berlin) along with becoming a scientific member of the Kaiser-Wilhelm-Institut für physikalische Chemie und Elektrochemie (KWIPC, Kaiser Wilhelm Institute of Physical Chemistry and Electrochemistry) of the Kaiser-Wilhelm Gesellschaft (KWG, Kaiser Wilhelm Society).

Ladenburg went to the United States as early as 1930, where he became a Brackett Research Professor at the Palmer Physics Laboratory, Princeton University. When the emigration wave from Germany began in April 1933, Ladenburg was the principal coordinator for the employment of exiled physicists in the United States. He retired from Princeton in 1950.

Articles
Rudolf Ladenburg and Stanislaw Loria Nature, Anomalous Dispersion of Luminous Hydrogen Volume 79, 7-7 (5 November 1908)
Rudolf Ladenburg Die quantentheoretische Bedeutung der Zahl der Dispersionelektronen, Z. Phys. Volume 4, Number 4, 451-468 (1921). Received on 8 February 1921. Institutional affiliation: Breslau, Physikal. Institut der Universität. English translation: The quantum-theoretical number of dispersion electrons in B. L. van der Waerden Sources of Quantum Mechanics (Dover, 1968) pp. 139 – 157.
R. Ladenburg and F. Reiche Dispersionsgesetz und Bohrsche Atomtheorie, Die Naturwissenschaften , Volume 12, Issue 33, pp. 672–673 (1924)
Hans Kopfermann and Rudolf Ladenburg Elektrooptische Untersuchungen am Natriumdampf. (Anomale elektrische Doppelbrechung; Starkeffekt an der Resonanzstrahlung), Annalen der Physik, Volume 383, Issue 23, pp. 659–679 (1925)
Hans Kopfermann and Rudolf Ladenburg Untersuchungen über die anomale Dispersion angeregter Gase II Teil. Anomale Dispersion in angeregtem Neon Einfluß von Strom und Druck, Bildung und Vernichtung angeregter Atome, Zeitschrift für Physik Volume 48, Numbers 1-2, pp. 26–50 (January, 1928). Received 17 December 1927. Institutional affiliation: Kaiser-Wilhelm Institut für physikalische Chemie und Elektrochemie, Berlin-Dahlem.
H. Kopfermann and R. Ladenburg Experimental Proof of ‘Negative Dispersion’, Nature Volume 122, 438-439 (22 September 1928)
R. Ladenburg and S. Levy Untersuchungen über die anomale Dispersion angeregter Gase VI. Teil: Kontrollversuche für den Nachweis der negativen Dispersion: Absorption, anomale Dispersion, Intensitätsverteilung und Intensität verschiedener Neonlinien Zeitschrift für Physik Volume 65, Numbers 3-4. pp. 189–206 (March, 1930). Received 12 August 1930. Institutional affiliation: Kaiser-Wilhelm Institut für physikalische Chemie und Elektrochemie, Berlin-Dahlem.
Rudolf Ladenburg Dispersion in Electrically Excited Gases Rev. Mod. Phys.  Volume 5, 243 - 256 (1933). The author was cited as being at Princeton University.
Rudolf W. Ladenburg Light absorption and distribution of atmospheric ozone, Journal of the Optical Society of America, Volume 25, Issue 9, p. 259 (1935)
Max Born, R. Fürth, and Rudolf Ladenburg Long Duration of the Balmer Spectrum in Hydrogen, Nature Volume 157, pp. 159–159 (9 February 1946). Institutional affiliations: Born and Fürth were identified as being in the Department of Mathematical Physics, The University, Edinburgh, and Ladenburg was identified as being in the Palmer Physical Laboratory, Princeton University, Princeton, New Jersey.

Books
Rudolf Walter Ladenburg Planck's elementares Wirkungsquantum und die Methoden zu seiner Messung (Hirzel, 1921)

Notes

Further reading

 Hentschel, Klaus (Editor) and Ann M. Hentschel (Editorial Assistant and Translator) Physics and National Socialism: An Anthology of Primary Sources (Birkhäuser, 1996)
 Glaser, Ludwig Juden in der Physik: Jüdische Physik, Zeitschrift für die gesamte Naturwissenschaften Volume 5, Number 8, 272-272 (November 1939). Translated and published as Document 77 Ludwig Glaser: Jews in Physics: Jewish Physics [November 1939], in Hentschel, Klaus (Editor) and Ann M. Hentschel (Editorial Assistant and Translator) Physics and National Socialism: An Anthology of Primary Sources (Birkhäuser, 1996) pp. 223–234.

1882 births
1952 deaths
20th-century German physicists
German atheists
German emigrants to the United States
Princeton University faculty
German people of Jewish descent
Jewish atheists
Jewish physicists
Max Planck Institute directors
Fellows of the American Physical Society